Gregory has been the name of sixteen Roman Catholic Popes and two Antipopes:

Pope Gregory I ("the Great"; 590–604), after whom the Gregorian chant is named
Pope Gregory II (715–731)
Pope Gregory III (731–741)
Pope Gregory IV (827–844)
Pope Gregory V (996–999)
Pope Gregory VI (1045–1046)
Antipope Gregory VI
Pope Gregory VII (1073–1085), after whom the Gregorian Reform is named
Pope Gregory VIII (1187)
Antipope Gregory VIII
Pope Gregory IX (1227–1241)
Pope Gregory X (1271–1276)
Pope Gregory XI (1370–1378)
Pope Gregory XII (1406–1415)
Pope Gregory XIII (1572–1585), after whom the Gregorian calendar is named
Pope Gregory XIV (1590–1591)
Pope Gregory XV (1621–1623)
Pope Gregory XVI (1831–1846)

See also
 Clemente Domínguez y Gómez (1946–2005), Antipope Gregory XVII of the Palmarian Catholic Church
 Ginés Jesús Hernández (born 1959), former Antipope Gregory XVIII of the Palmarian Catholic Church
 Greg Pope (born 1960), British Labour Party politician
 Gregory (disambiguation)
 Saint Gregory (disambiguation)
 Gregorian (disambiguation)

Gregory